Hydrocephalus is a condition in which an accumulation of cerebrospinal fluid (CSF) occurs within the brain. This typically causes increased pressure inside the skull. Older people may have headaches, double vision, poor balance, urinary incontinence, personality changes, or mental impairment. In babies, it may be seen as a rapid increase in head size. Other symptoms may include vomiting, sleepiness, seizures, and downward pointing of the eyes.

Hydrocephalus can occur due to birth defects or be acquired later in life. Associated birth defects include neural tube defects and those that result in aqueductal stenosis. Other causes include meningitis, brain tumors, traumatic brain injury, intraventricular hemorrhage, and subarachnoid hemorrhage. The four types of hydrocephalus are communicating, noncommunicating, ex vacuo, and normal pressure. Diagnosis is typically made by physical examination and medical imaging.

Hydrocephalus is typically treated by the surgical placement of a shunt system. A procedure called a third ventriculostomy is an option in some people. Complications from shunts may include overdrainage, underdrainage, mechanical failure, infection, or obstruction. This may require replacement. Outcomes are variable, but many people with shunts live normal lives. Without treatment, death or permanent disability may occur.

About one to two per 1,000 newborns have hydrocephalus. Rates in the developing world may be higher. Normal pressure hydrocephalus is estimated to affect about 5 per 100,000 people, with rates increasing with age. Description of hydrocephalus by Hippocrates dates back more than 2,000 years.

Signs and symptoms

The clinical presentation of hydrocephalus varies with chronicity. Acute dilatation of the ventricular system is more likely to manifest with the nonspecific signs and symptoms of increased intracranial pressure (ICP). By contrast, chronic dilatation (especially in the elderly population) may have a more insidious onset presenting, for instance, with Hakim's triad (Adams' triad).

Symptoms of increased ICP may include headaches, vomiting, nausea, papilledema, sleepiness, or coma. With increased levels of CSF, there have been cases of hearing loss due to CSF creating pressure on the auditory pathways or disrupting the communication of inner ear fluid. Elevated ICP of different etiologies have been linked to sensorineural hearing loss (SNHL). Transient SNHL has been reported after the loss of CSF with shunt surgeries. Hearing loss is a rare but well-known sequela of procedures resulting in CSF loss. Elevated ICP may result in uncal or tonsillar herniation, with resulting life-threatening brain stem compression.

Hakim's triad of gait instability, urinary incontinence, and dementia is a relatively typical manifestation of the distinct entity normal-pressure hydrocephalus. Focal neurological deficits may also occur, such as abducens nerve palsy and vertical gaze palsy (Parinaud syndrome due to compression of the quadrigeminal plate, where the neural centers coordinating the conjugated vertical eye movement are located). The symptoms depend on the cause of the blockage, the person's age, and how much brain tissue has been damaged by the swelling.

In infants with hydrocephalus, CSF builds up in the central nervous system (CNS), causing the fontanelle (soft spot) to bulge and the head to be larger than expected. Early symptoms may also include:
 Eyes that appear to gaze downward
 Irritability
 Seizures
 Separated sutures
 Sleepiness
 Vomiting

Symptoms that may occur in older children can include:
 Brief, shrill, high-pitched cry
 Changes in personality, memory, or the ability to reason or think
 Changes in facial appearance and eye spacing (craniofacial disproportion)
 Crossed eyes or uncontrolled eye movements
 Difficulty feeding
 Excessive sleepiness
 Headaches
 Irritability, poor temper control
 Loss of bladder control (urinary incontinence)
 Loss of coordination and trouble walking
 Muscle spasticity (spasm)
 Slow growth (child 0–5 years)
 Delayed milestones
 Failure to thrive
 Slow or restricted movement
 Vomiting

Because hydrocephalus can injure the brain, thought and behavior may be adversely affected. Learning disabilities, including short-term memory loss, are common among those with hydrocephalus, who tend to score better on verbal IQ than on performance IQ, which is thought to reflect the distribution of nerve damage to the brain. Hydrocephalus that is present from birth can cause long-term complications with speech and language. Children can have issues such as nonverbal learning disorder, difficulty understanding complex and abstract concepts, difficulty retrieving stored information, and spatial/perceptual disorders. Children with hydrocephalus are often known in having the difficulty in understanding the concepts within conversation and tend to use words they know or have heard. However, the severity of hydrocephalus can differ considerably between individuals, and some are of average or above-average intelligence. Someone with hydrocephalus may have coordination and visual problems, or clumsiness. They may reach puberty earlier than the average child (this is called precocious puberty). About one in four develops epilepsy.

Cause

Congenital

Congenital hydrocephalus is present in the infant prior to birth, meaning the fetus developed hydrocephalus in utero during fetal development. The most common cause of congenital hydrocephalus is aqueductal stenosis, which occurs when the narrow passage between the third and fourth ventricles in the brain is blocked or too narrow to allow sufficient cerebral spinal fluid to drain. Fluid accumulates in the upper ventricles, causing hydrocephalus.

Other causes of congenital hydrocephalus include neural-tube defects, arachnoid cysts, Dandy–Walker syndrome, and Arnold–Chiari malformation.
The cranial bones fuse by the end of the third year of life. For head enlargement to occur, hydrocephalus must occur before then. The causes are usually genetic, but can also be acquired and usually occur within the first few months of life, which include intraventricular matrix hemorrhages in premature infants, infections, type II Arnold-Chiari malformation, aqueduct atresia and stenosis, and Dandy-Walker malformation. Hydrocephalus has also been seen in cases of congenital syphilis.

In newborns and toddlers with hydrocephalus, the head circumference is enlarged rapidly and soon surpasses the 97th percentile. Since the skull bones have not yet firmly joined, bulging, firm anterior and posterior fontanelles may be present even when the person is in an upright position.

The infant exhibits fretfulness, poor feeding, and frequent vomiting. As the hydrocephalus progresses, torpor sets in, and infants show lack of interest in their surroundings. Later on, their upper eyelids become retracted and their eyes are turned downwards ("sunset eyes") (due to hydrocephalic pressure on the mesencephalic tegmentum and paralysis of upward gaze). Movements become weak and the arms may become tremulous. Papilledema is absent, but vision may be reduced. The head becomes so enlarged that they eventually may be bedridden.

About 80–90% of fetuses or newborn infants with spina bifida—often associated with meningocele or myelomeningocele—develop hydrocephalus.

Acquired
This condition is acquired as a consequence of CNS infections, meningitis, brain tumors, head trauma, toxoplasmosis, or intracranial hemorrhage (subarachnoid or intraparenchymal), and is usually painful.

Type
The cause of hydrocephalus is not known with certainty and is probably multifactorial. It may be caused by impaired CSF flow, reabsorption, or excessive CSF production.
 Obstruction to CSF flow hinders its free passage through the ventricular system and subarachnoid space (e.g., stenosis of the cerebral aqueduct or obstruction of the interventricular foramina secondary to tumors, hemorrhages, infections or congenital malformations) and can cause increases in ICP.
 Hydrocephalus can also be caused by overproduction of CSF (relative obstruction) (e.g., choroid plexus papilloma, villous hypertrophy).
 Bilateral ureteric obstruction is a rare, but reported, cause of hydrocephalus.

Hydrocephalus can be classified into communicating and noncommunicating (obstructive). Both forms can be either congenital or acquired.

Communicating
Communicating hydrocephalus, also known as nonobstructive hydrocephalus, is caused by impaired CSF reabsorption in the absence of any obstruction of CSF flow between the ventricles and subarachnoid space. This may be due to functional impairment of the arachnoidal granulations (also called arachnoid granulations or Pacchioni's granulations), which are located along the superior sagittal sinus, and is the site of CSF reabsorption back into the venous system. Various neurologic conditions may result in communicating hydrocephalus, including subarachnoid/intraventricular hemorrhage, meningitis, and congenital absence of arachnoid villi. Scarring and fibrosis of the subarachnoid space following infectious, inflammatory, or hemorrhagic events can also prevent reabsorption of CSF, causing diffuse ventricular dilatation.

Noncommunicating
Noncommunicating hydrocephalus, or obstructive hydrocephalus, is caused by an obstruction to the flow of CSF.
 Foramen of Monro obstruction may lead to dilation of one, or if large enough (e.g., in colloid cyst), both lateral ventricles.
 The aqueduct of Sylvius, normally narrow, may be obstructed by a number of genetic or acquired lesions (e.g., atresia, ependymitis, hemorrhage, or tumor) and lead to dilation of both lateral ventricles, as well as the third ventricle.
 Fourth ventricle obstruction leads to dilatation of the aqueduct, as well as the lateral and third ventricles (e.g., Chiari malformation).
 The foramina of Luschka and foramen of Magendie may be obstructed due to congenital malformation (e.g., Dandy–Walker malformation).

Other

 Normal pressure hydrocephalus (NPH) is a particular form of chronic communicating hydrocephalus, characterized by enlarged cerebral ventricles, with only intermittently elevated cerebrospinal fluid pressure. Characteristic triad of symptoms are; dementia, apraxic gait and urinary incontinence. The diagnosis of NPH can be established only with the help of continuous intraventricular pressure recordings (over 24 hours or even longer), since more often than not instant measurements yield normal pressure values. Dynamic compliance studies may be also helpful. Altered compliance (elasticity) of the ventricular walls, as well as increased viscosity of the cerebrospinal fluid, may play a role in the pathogenesis.
 Hydrocephalus ex vacuo also refers to an enlargement of cerebral ventricles and subarachnoid spaces, and is usually due to brain atrophy (as it occurs in dementias), post-traumatic brain injuries, and even in some psychiatric disorders, such as schizophrenia. As opposed to hydrocephalus, this is a compensatory enlargement of the CSF-spaces in response to brain parenchyma loss; it is not the result of increased CSF pressure.

Mechanism

Hydrocephalus is usually due to blockage of CSF outflow in the ventricles or in the subarachnoid space over the brain. In a person without hydrocephalus, CSF continuously circulates through the brain, its ventricles and the spinal cord and is continuously drained away into the circulatory system. Alternatively, the condition may result from an overproduction of the CSF, from a congenital malformation blocking normal drainage of the fluid, or from complications of head injuries or infections.

Compression of the brain by the accumulating fluid eventually may cause neurological symptoms such as convulsions, intellectual disability, and epileptic seizures. These signs occur sooner in adults, whose skulls are no longer able to expand to accommodate the increasing fluid volume within. Fetuses, infants, and young children with hydrocephalus typically have an abnormally large head, excluding the face, because the pressure of the fluid causes the individual skull bones—which have yet to fuse—to bulge outward at their juncture points. Another medical sign, in infants, is a characteristic fixed downward gaze with whites of the eyes showing above the iris, as though the infant were trying to examine its own lower eyelids.

The elevated ICP may cause compression of the brain, leading to brain damage and other complications. A complication often overlooked is the possibility of hearing loss due to ICP. The mechanism of ICP on hearing loss is presumed that the transmission of CSF pressure to and from the Perilymphatic space through a patent cochlear aqueduct. The cochlear aqueduct connects the Perilymphatic space of the inner ear with the subarachnoid space of the posterior cranial fossa. A loss of CSF pressure can induce Perilymphatic loss or endolymphatic hydrops resembling the clinical presentation of Ménière's disease associated hearing loss in the low frequencies.

CSF can accumulate within the ventricles, this condition is called internal hydrocephalus and may result in increased CSF pressure. The production of CSF continues, even when the passages that normally allow it to exit the brain are blocked. Consequently, fluid builds inside the brain, causing pressure that dilates the ventricles and compresses the nervous tissue. Compression of the nervous tissue usually results in irreversible brain damage. If the skull bones are not completely ossified when the hydrocephalus occurs, the pressure may also severely enlarge the head. The cerebral aqueduct may be blocked at the time of birth or may become blocked later in life because of a tumor growing in the brainstem.

Treatments

Procedures

Hydrocephalus treatment is surgical, creating a way for the excess fluid to drain away. In the short term, an external ventricular drain (EVD), also known as an extraventricular drain or ventriculostomy, provides relief. In the long term, some people will need any of various types of cerebral shunt. It involves the placement of a ventricular catheter (a tube made of silastic) into the cerebral ventricles to bypass the flow obstruction/malfunctioning arachnoidal granulations and drain the excess fluid into other body cavities, from where it can be resorbed. Most shunts drain the fluid into the peritoneal cavity (ventriculoperitoneal shunt), but alternative sites include the right atrium (ventriculoatrial shunt), pleural cavity (ventriculopleural shunt), and gallbladder. A shunt system can also be placed in the lumbar space of the spine and have the CSF redirected to the peritoneal cavity (lumbar-peritoneal shunt). An alternative treatment for obstructive hydrocephalus in selected people is the endoscopic third ventriculostomy (ETV), whereby a surgically created opening in the floor of the third ventricle allows the CSF to flow directly to the basal cisterns, thereby shortcutting any obstruction, as in aqueductal stenosis. This may or may not be appropriate based on individual anatomy. For infants, ETV is sometimes combined with choroid plexus cauterization, which reduces the amount of cerebrospinal fluid produced by the brain. The technique, known as ETV/CPC, was pioneered in Uganda by neurosurgeon Benjamin Warf and is now in use in several U.S. hospitals. Hydrocephalus can be successfully treated by placing a drainage tube (shunt) between the brain ventricles and abdominal cavity. Some risk exists of infection being introduced into the brain through these shunts, as they must be replaced as the person grows.

External hydrocephalus
External hydrocephalus is a condition generally seen in infants which involves enlarged fluid spaces or subarachnoid spaces around the outside of the brain. This condition is generally benign, and resolves spontaneously by two years of age and therefore usually does not require insertion of a shunt. Imaging studies and a good medical history can help to differentiate external hydrocephalus from subdural hemorrhages or symptomatic chronic extra-axial fluid collections which are accompanied by vomiting, headaches, and seizures.

Shunt complications
Examples of possible complications include shunt malfunction, shunt failure, and shunt infection, along with infection of the shunt tract following surgery (the most common reason for shunt failure is infection of the shunt tract). Although a shunt generally works well, it may stop working if it disconnects, becomes blocked (clogged) or infected, or it is outgrown. If this happens, the CSF begins to accumulate again and a number of physical symptoms develop (headaches, nausea, vomiting, photophobia/light sensitivity), some extremely serious, such as seizures. The shunt failure rate is also relatively high (of the 40,000 surgeries performed annually to treat hydrocephalus, only 30% are a person's first surgery) and people not uncommonly have multiple shunt revisions within their lifetimes.

Another complication can occur when CSF drains more rapidly than it is produced by the choroid plexus, causing symptoms of listlessness, severe headaches, irritability, light sensitivity, auditory hyperesthesia (sound sensitivity), hearing loss, nausea, vomiting, dizziness, vertigo, migraines, seizures, a change in personality, weakness in the arms or legs, strabismus, and double vision to appear when the person is vertical. If the person lies down, the symptoms usually vanish quickly. A CT scan may or may not show any change in ventricle size, particularly if the person has a history of slit-like ventricles. Difficulty in diagnosing over-drainage can make treatment of this complication particularly frustrating for people and their families. Resistance to traditional analgesic pharmacological therapy may also be a sign of shunt overdrainage or failure.

Following placement of a ventriculoperitoneal shunt there have been cases of a decrease in post-surgery hearing. It is presumed that the cochlea aqueduct is responsible for the decrease in hearing thresholds. The cochlea aqueduct has been considered as a probable channel where CSF pressure can be transmitted. Therefore, the reduced CSF pressure could cause a decrease in Perilymphatic pressure and cause secondary endolymphatic hydrops. In addition to the increased hearing loss, there have also been findings of resolved hearing loss after ventriculoperitoneal shunt placement, where there is a release of CSF pressure on the auditory pathways.

The diagnosis of CSF buildup is complex and requires specialist expertise. Diagnosis of the particular complication usually depends on when the symptoms appear, that is, whether symptoms occur when the person is upright or in a prone position, with the head at roughly the same level as the feet.

Standardized protocols for inserting cerebral shunts have been shown to reduce shunt infections. There is tentative evidence that preventative antibiotics may decrease the risk of shunt infections.

Epidemiology
The hydrocephalus disease burden are concentrated in the developing world while North America and Canada has the least number of cases. A systematic review in 2019 estimated that there are 180,000 childhood hydrocephalus cases from African continent alone per year, followed by 90,000 cases from Southeast Asia and Western Pacific. Latin America also has high prevalence of hydrocephalus. However, data on hydrocephalus disease burden in adults are lacking.

History

In the pre-historic area, there were various paintings or artifacts depicting children or adults with macrocephaly (large head) or clinical findings of hydrocephalus. However, due to lack of writing, it was unknown how the people thought of the disorder at that time and the ways to treat the disease.

References to hydrocephalic skulls can be found in ancient Egyptian medical literature from 2,500 BC to 500 AD. Hydrocephalus was described more clearly by the ancient Greek physician Hippocrates in the fourth century BC, while a more accurate description was later given by the Roman physician Galen in the second century AD.

The first clinical description of an operative procedure for hydrocephalus appears in the Al-Tasrif (1,000 AD) by the Arab surgeon Abulcasis, who clearly described the evacuation of superficial intracranial fluid in hydrocephalic children. He described it in his chapter on neurosurgical disease, describing infantile hydrocephalus as being caused by mechanical compression. He wrote:

In 1881, a few years after the landmark study of Retzius and Key, Carl Wernicke pioneered sterile ventricular puncture and external drainage of CSF for the treatment of hydrocephalus. It remained an intractable condition until the 20th century, when cerebral shunt and other neurosurgical treatment modalities were developed.

It is a lesser-known medical condition; relatively little research is conducted to improve treatment, and still no cure has been found. In developing countries, the condition often goes untreated at birth. Before birth, the condition is difficult to diagnose, and access to medical treatment is limited. However, when head swelling is prominent, children are taken at great expense for treatment. By then, brain tissue is undeveloped and neurosurgery is rare and difficult. Children more commonly live with undeveloped brain tissue and consequential intellectual disabilities and restrictions.

Society and culture

Name 
The word hydrocephalus is from the Greek  meaning 'water' and  meaning 'head'. Other names for hydrocephalus include "water on the brain", a historical name, and "water baby syndrome".

Awareness campaign

The resolution campaign is due in part to the advocacy work of the Pediatric Hydrocephalus Foundation. Prior to July 2009, no awareness month for this condition had been designated. Many hydrocephalus organizations, such as the One Small Voice Foundation, promote awareness and fundraising activities.

Exceptional case
One case of hydrocephalus was a man whose brain shrank to a thin sheet of tissue, due to a buildup of cerebrospinal fluid in his skull. As a child, the man had a shunt, but it was removed when he was 14. In July 2007, at age 44, he went to a hospital due to mild weakness in his left leg. When doctors learned of the man's medical history, they performed a CT and MRI scan, and were astonished to see "massive enlargement" of the lateral ventricles in the skull. Dr. Lionel Feuillet of Hôpital de la Timone in Marseille said, "The images were most unusual... the brain was virtually absent." Intelligence tests showed the person had an IQ of 75, considered "Borderline intellectual functioning", just above what would be officially classified as intectually disabled.

The person was a married father of two children, and worked as a civil servant, leading an at least superficially normal life, despite having enlarged ventricles with a decreased volume of brain tissue. "What I find amazing to this day is how the brain can deal with something which you think should not be compatible with life", commented Dr. Max Muenke, a pediatric brain-defect specialist at the National Human Genome Research Institute. "If something happens very slowly over quite some time, maybe over decades, the different parts of the brain take up functions that would normally be done by the part that is pushed to the side."

Notable cases 
 Ice hockey player Colby Cave had acute obstructive hydrocephalus due to a colloid cyst.
 Author Sherman Alexie, born with the condition, wrote about it in his semi-autobiographical junior fiction novel The Absolutely True Diary of a Part-Time Indian.
 Prince William, Duke of Gloucester (1689–1700), probably contracted meningitis at birth, which resulted in this condition.
 Emperor Ferdinand I of Austria (1793–1875) became emperor in 1835 despite various health issues including hydrocephalus and epilepsy.
 In the American folklore of the states of Ohio, Michigan, and Connecticut, an urban legend exists about the melon heads, the inbred descendants of families of people born with hydrocephaly.
 Masato Kudo, a professional soccer player, died of hydrocephalus on October 21, 2022.

References

External links 

 
 Guidelines for pediatric hydrocephalus

Congenital disorders of nervous system
Disorders causing seizures
Pediatrics
Ventricular system
Wikipedia medicine articles ready to translate
Wikipedia neurology articles ready to translate